The 2017 Kakinada Municipal Corporation election was held on 10 August 2017. Its purpose was to elect members for all 48 wards of the municipal corporation for this municipality in India. After three decades of running, the Telugu Desam Party won the election, securing 32 of the 48 seats.

Election schedule

References

2017 local elections in Andhra Pradesh
Kakinada
Kakinada